Lee Township is a civil township of Midland County in the U.S. state of Michigan. The population was 4,411 at the 2000 census.

Geography

Demographics
As of the census of 2000, there were 4,411 people, 1,514 households, and 1,200 families residing in the township. The racial makeup of the township was 96.98% White, 0.18% African American, 0.86% Native American, 0.16% Asian, 0.23% from other races, and 1.59% from two or more races. Hispanic or Latino of any race were 1.02% of the population.

There were 1,514 households, out of which 42.9% had children under the age of 18 living with them, 62.1% were married couples living together, 11.5% had a female householder with no husband present, and 20.7% were non-families. 15.1% of all households were made up of individuals, and 4.1% had someone living alone who was 65 years of age or older.  The average household size was 2.90 and the average family size was 3.21.

In the township the population was spread out, with 31.4% under the age of 18, 8.0% from 18 to 24, 33.0% from 25 to 44, 21.0% from 45 to 64, and 6.6% who were 65 years of age or older.  The median age was 32 years. For every 100 females, there were 100.9 males.  For every 100 females age 18 and over, there were 97.8 males.

The median income for a household in the township was $36,518, and the median income for a family was $40,871. Males had a median income of $32,443 versus $19,176 for females. The per capita income for the township was $15,289.  About 11.8% of families and 14.9% of the population were below the poverty line, including 20.4% of those under age 18 and 5.5% of those age 65 or over.

References

Townships in Midland County, Michigan
Townships in Michigan
1880 establishments in Michigan
Populated places established in 1880